Longoni is a surname of Italian origin. Notable people with the surname include:

Andrea Longoni (born 1983), Italian sports journalist and television presenter
Angelo Longoni (born 1933), Italian footballer
 Carlo Longoni (1889 – 1969), Italian racing cyclist
Emilio Longoni (1859–1932), Italian painter
Lucas Longoni (born 1985), Italian Argentine footballer
Tarcisio Longoni (1913–1990), Italian politician

Italian-language surnames